Manzil is one of the seven parts of the Qur'an.

Manzil may also refer to:

 Manzil (1936 film)
 Manzil (1960 film), a 1960 Hindi film directed by Mandi Burman
 Manzil (1979 film), a 1979 Hindi film directed by Basu Chatterjee
 Manzil (Pakistani TV series), a 2006 Pakistani drama television series
 Manzil (Maldivian TV series), 1994 Maldivian drama television series

See also
 Manzil Manzil, a 1984 Indian film directed by Nasir Hussain
 Manzil Abu Ruqaybah,  a town in extreme north Tunisia
 Lunar mansion (Arabic: plural manāzil al-qamar), stations of the moon in astronomy